Joshua Nebo (born July 17, 1997) is an American professional basketball player for Maccabi Tel Aviv of the Israeli Basketball Premier League and the EuroLeague. He played college basketball for the Saint Francis Red Flash and the Texas A&M Aggies. In 2020-21 he led the Israel Basketball Premier League in rebounds per game.

Early life and high school career
Nebo was born in Houston and later lived in Katy, Texas, and grew up skateboarding and playing defensive end in football. He first began playing basketball in middle school. Nebo attended Cypress Lakes High School, where he was frequently overshadowed by teammate De'Aaron Fox. As a senior, Nebo helped lead Cypress Lakes to the Class 6A state quarterfinals in 2015. Lightly recruited, he signed with Saint Francis (PA).

College career
Nebo grew three inches and gained 50 pounds during his first two years in college. He averaged 4.9 points and 5.1 rebounds per game as a freshman at Saint Francis and finished second in the conference in blocks with 56. On February 2, 2017, he scored a career-high 24 points and grabbed 11 rebounds in a 78–61 win over St. Francis Brooklyn. As a sophomore, Nebo averaged 12 points and 8.3 rebounds per game. Nebo was named to the Third Team All-Northeast Conference (NEC) and NEC Defensive Player of the Year during his sophomore season after setting the single-season record with 89 blocks. Following the season, he transferred to Texas A&M.

Nebo cited homesickness and the fact that his parents were not able to attend his games as the reasons for his transfer. He scored a season-high 21 points and had seven rebounds on January 12, 2019, in an 81–80 win against Alabama. Nebo made two starts as a junior and averaged 8.1 points and 5.3 rebounds per game. Coming into his senior season, he missed much of the preseason with a torn hamstring. Nebo scored a season-high 21 points in an 87–75 victory against Mississippi State on February 22, 2020. As a senior, Nebo averaged 12.5 points and 6.2 rebounds per game.

Professional career

On July 26, 2020, Nebo signed with Hapoel Eilat of the Israeli Basketball Premier League. He averaged 13.9 points per game and led the Israeli Basketball Premier League with 9.9 rebounds per game, was third with a .665 field goal percentage, and was sixth with 1.1 blocks per game. He was named 2021 Eurobasket All-Israeli League Second Team.

On June 21, 2021, Nebo signed with Žalgiris Kaunas of the Lithuanian Basketball League. Playing for them in the Euroleauge Nebo started 17 out of 28 games and averaged 8.8 points (65% from 2-point range) and 6.2 rebounds (6th-best in the league).

On July 1, 2022, Nebo signed with Maccabi Tel Aviv of the Israeli Basketball Premier League.

Career statistics

College

|-
| style="text-align:left;"| 2015–16
| style="text-align:left;"| Saint Francis
| 30 || 29 || 22.8 || .487 || – || .522 || 5.1 || .5 || .2 || 1.9 || 4.9
|-
| style="text-align:left;"| 2016–17
| style="text-align:left;"| Saint Francis
| 34 || 32 || 29.7 || .566 || .500 || .595 || 8.2 || .7 || .3 || 2.6 || 12.0
|-
| style="text-align:left;"| 2017–18
| style="text-align:left;"| Texas A&M
| style="text-align:center;" colspan="11"|  Redshirt
|-
| style="text-align:left;"| 2018–19
| style="text-align:left;"| Texas A&M
| 30 || 2 || 19.6 || .699 || – || .695 || 5.4 || .3 || .2 || 2.3 || 8.1
|-
| style="text-align:left;"| 2019–20
| style="text-align:left;"| Texas A&M
| 29 || 27 || 28.8 || .665 || .000 || .613 || 6.2 || .8 || .4 || 1.9 || 12.5
|- class="sortbottom"
| style="text-align:center;" colspan="2"| Career
| 123 || 90 || 25.4 || .604 || .333 || .609 || 6.3 || .6 || .3 || 2.2 || 9.4

References

External links
 Texas A&M Aggies
 Saint Francis Red Flash bio
 Proballers.com Profile

1997 births
Living people
American expatriate basketball people in Israel
American expatriate basketball people in Lithuania
American men's basketball players
Basketball players from Houston
Hapoel Eilat basketball players
BC Žalgiris players
Maccabi Tel Aviv B.C. players
Power forwards (basketball)
Saint Francis Red Flash men's basketball players
Texas A&M Aggies men's basketball players